Redbird is the sixth studio album by Heather Nova, released on August 30, 2005. The album includes a cover of Chris Isaak's "Wicked Game".  The first track, "Welcome", was also released in 2005 as a single in Europe.  "Welcome" also appeared on the U.S./Canadian release of South. The album was produced by Nova's husband and long term producer Felix Tod, except for "Welcome" which was produced by The Matrix. When talking about the album, Heather has said:

Track listing
All songs by Heather Nova, except where noted.

"Welcome" (Danny Campbell, Heather Nova, Dido) – 4:18
"I Miss My Sky" (Amelia Earhart's Last Days) – 5:05
"Motherland" – 4:25
"Redbird" – 4:16
"Done Drifting" – 4:10
"Overturned" – 3:26
"Mesmerized" – 4:14
"Singing You Through" – 4:11
"A Way to Live" – 3:51
"Wicked Game" (Chris Isaak) – 4:51
"This Body" – 3:47
"The Sun Will Always Rise" – 4:43

Charts

References

2005 albums
Heather Nova albums